Phenatoma roseum, or the pink tower shell, is a species of predatory sea snail, a marine gastropod mollusc in the family Borsoniidae.

Description
The size of an adult shell varies between 23 mm and 34 mm; its width is 11 mm. The shell is spirally sulcate and longitudinally striate. The suture is slightly impressed, marginate and subcrenulate. The sinus is rather broad and shallow. It has a rose-ash color, purple-rose within the aperture.

Distribution
This species is endemic to New Zealand and Tasmania.

References 

 Hutton, F.W. (1885). New species of Tertiary shells. New Zealand Journal of Science (1) 2 (11): 524
 Maxwell, P.A. (2009). Cenozoic Mollusca. Pp 232-254 in Gordon, D.P. (ed.) New Zealand inventory of biodiversity. Volume one. Kingdom Animalia: Radiata, Lophotrochozoa, Deuterostomia. Canterbury University Press, Christchurch.
 Spencer, H.G., Marshall, B.A. & Willan, R.C. (2009). Checklist of New Zealand living Mollusca. Pp 196-219. in: Gordon, D.P. (ed.) New Zealand inventory of biodiversity. Volume one. Kingdom Animalia: Radiata, Lophotrochozoa, Deuterostomia. Canterbury University Press,

External links
 
 Quoy, Jean Rene Constant, Paul Gaimard, and Jules Dumont D'Urville. Voyage de découvertes de l'Astrolabe exécuté par orde du Roi pendant les années 1826-1829 sous le commandement de m. J. Dumont D'Urville: troisième division, Zoologie. Tastu, 1833
 Reeve, L. A. (1843-1846). Monograph of the genus Pleurotoma. In: Conchologia Iconica, or, illustrations of the shells of molluscous animals, vol. 1, pl. 1-40 and unpaginated text. L. Reeve & Co., London.
 Spencer H.G., Willan R.C., Marshall B.A. & Murray T.J. (2011). Checklist of the Recent Mollusca Recorded from the New Zealand Exclusive Economic Zone
  Bouchet P., Kantor Yu.I., Sysoev A. & Puillandre N. (2011) A new operational classification of the Conoidea. Journal of Molluscan Studies 77: 273–308.

Further reading 
 Powell A. W. B., New Zealand Mollusca, William Collins Publishers Ltd, Auckland, New Zealand 1979 

roseum
Gastropods of New Zealand